Syn otechestva, which translates as Son of the Fatherland, was a Russian literary magazine published in the 19th century in St. Petersburg from 1812 to 1852. It was influential in the development of social thought and literature in Russia.

The magazine was edited by Nicholas Gretsch between 1812 and 1837. His main assistant was Faddei Bulgarin. Syn otechestva was Russia's most influential magazine between the Napoleonic wars and the Decembrist Revolt. It grew increasingly conservative after Nicholas I's accession to the throne, losing a liberal-minded readership to Sovremennik and Otechestvennye Zapiski. In 1837 Gretsch and Bulgarin sold Syn otechestva to Aleksandr Smirdin. Later editors included Nikolai Polevoy, Aleksandr Nikitenko, and Osip Senkovsky.

Another magazine of the same name was published in Russian from 1856 to 1861 and a newspaper with the same name was published in Russian from 1862 to 1901.

References

External links
Editions of Syn otechestva available for download at Google Books

Defunct literary magazines published in Europe
Defunct magazines published in Russia
Magazines established in 1812
Magazines disestablished in 1852
Magazines published in Saint Petersburg
Russian-language magazines
Literary magazines published in Russia